The following is a summary of Donegal county football team's 2017 season.

Squad
Ethan O'Donnell

Personnel changes
Richard Thornton from Coalisland helped train the team in 2017. Thornton took over from former Westmeath footballer Jack Cooney after two years, while Brendan Kilcoyne stayed on as a selector.

2012 All Star Colm McFadden retired at the end of the previous season. As did Eamon McGee (though he never won an All Star).

Christy Toye, Rory Kavanagh and David Walsh also retired ahead of the 2017 season. Leo McLoone also left. So did Odhrán Mac Niallais. And Anthony Thompson.

On Valentine's Day, Neil Gallagher attended training at Convoy — it was upon the Convoy turf that he broke down for the final time and relinquished his status as an inter-county footballer. The manager later described him as "very disappointed… He wanted to give it a go… He got the back re-scanned and tried to build it up". He announced his retirement from inter-county football at the age of 33 on 20 February 2017.

Competitions

Dr McKenna Cup

National Football League Division 1

In the opening game against Kerry, three players had their senior debuts (Jason McGee, Michael Langan and Jamie Brennan), with Caolan Ward and Paul Brennan making their first competitive starts.

Table

Reports

Ulster Senior Football Championship

The draw for the 2017 Ulster Senior Football Championship took place in Dublin in mid-October 2016. In the quarter-final victory against Antrim, four players had their first championship starts (Jamie Brennan, Michael Carroll, Jason McGee and Caolan Ward).

Bracket

Reports

All-Ireland Senior Football Championship

Management team
Strength and conditioning coach: Paul Fisher

Awards

All Stars
One nomination, for Patrick McBrearty.

Footballer of the Year
Patrick McBrearty

References

Donegal
Donegal county football team seasons